Kian Andersen (born 16 October 1991) is a Danish male badminton player.

Achievements

BWF International Challenge/Series
Men's Singles

 BWF International Challenge tournament
 BWF International Series tournament
 BWF Future Series tournament

References

External links
 

1991 births
Living people
Danish male badminton players